Juan Carlos Ramírez (born August 16, 1988) is a Nicaraguan professional baseball pitcher for the Sultanes de Monterrey of the Mexican League. He has played in Major League Baseball (MLB) for the Philadelphia Phillies, Arizona Diamondbacks, Seattle Mariners, Cincinnati Reds, and Los Angeles Angels, and in the Chinese Professional Baseball League (CPBL) for the Fubon Guardians.

Professional career

Seattle Mariners
With them, he went 5–1 with a 1.66 ERA in 14 games, 13 starts.

In , he pitched for the Class-A Wisconsin Timber Rattlers of the Midwest League, going 6–9 with a 4.14 ERA in 25 games, 22 starts.

He was added to the Mariners' 40-man roster on November 20 to protect him from the Rule 5 Draft.

Philadelphia Phillies
On December 16, 2009, Ramírez was traded with Phillippe Aumont and Tyson Gillies to the Philadelphia Phillies for major league pitcher Cliff Lee.
 
After the 2012 season, Ramirez played for the Nicaraguan national baseball team in the 2013 World Baseball Classic Qualifying Tournament.

On January 29, 2013, Ramírez was designated for assignment by the Phillies. On June 22, 2013, Ramirez's contract was selected and was called up to the Phillies after Mike Adams was placed on the disabled list. He made his MLB debut on June 23 in a game against the New York Mets, and struck out the side with his fastball velocity reaching as high as 98 MPH over one inning. On August 2, 2013, Ramírez was designated for assignment again by the Phillies. On August 25, Ramírez was selected back to the 40-man roster.

Ramírez was outrighted off the roster on October 16, 2013. He elected to become a free agent on October 18.

Cleveland Indians
Ramírez signed a minor league deal with the Cleveland Indians on November 1, 2013. Ramírez split the season between the Akron RubberDucks and Columbus Clippers.

Arizona Diamondbacks
Ramírez signed with the Arizona Diamondbacks on December 1, 2014. After beginning the year with the Reno Aces, Ramírez was selected to the active roster on May 10, 2015. On May 25, 2015, Ramírez suffered his first loss since 2013, surrendering a walk-off home run to Jhonny Peralta. On June 13, 2015, the Diamondbacks designated Ramírez for assignment.

Seattle Mariners (second stint)
Ramírez was traded by the Diamondbacks to the Seattle Mariners for cash on July 27, 2015. On September 8, 2015, the Mariners selected Ramírez to the active roster. On November 6, 2015, the Mariners outrighted Ramírez off of the 40-man roster and he elected free agency.

Cincinnati Reds
Ramírez signed with the Cincinnati Reds as a free agent on November 25, 2015. He pitched in 27 games for Cincinnati with a 1–3 record, 6.40 ERA, 1.36 WHIP and 28 strikeouts in 32.1 innings pitched.

Los Angeles Angels
Ramírez was claimed off waivers from the Cincinnati Reds on June 26, 2016. He pitched in a career-high 43 games and was an effective member of the bullpen, posting an ERA of 2.91 in 46 innings. In 2017, Ramírez began the season out of the bullpen, but due to numerous injuries to the Angels rotation he was pushed to a starting role. He was shut down in August after experiencing pain in his forearm. In 24 starts, he went 11–10 in  innings. Ramírez tore his UCL in his throwing elbow and underwent Tommy John surgery after only 2 starts for the 2018 season. He pitched  innings on the season with the Angels and was 0–2. On August 15, 2019, Ramírez was outrighted off the Angels roster after appearing in only 5 games due to injury. He elected free agency on October 14, 2019. On February 19, 2020, Ramírez re-signed with the Angels on a minor league deal. He became a free agent on November 2, 2020.

Fubon Guardians
On December 28, 2020, Ramírez signed with the Fubon Guardians of the Chinese Professional Baseball League for the 2021 season. On March 19, 2021, Ramírez made his CPBL debut. On July 9, Ramírez was released by the Guardians and left Taiwan.

Diablos Rojos del México
On July 13, 2021, Ramírez signed with the Diablos Rojos del México of the Mexican League. He was released on January 26, 2022.

Minnesota Twins
On March 31, 2022, Ramírez signed a minor league contract with the Minnesota Twins. He was released on July 13, 2022.

Sultanes de Monterrey
On February 22, 2023, Ramírez signed with the Sultanes de Monterrey of the Mexican League.

References

External links

J. C. Ramírez at SABR (Baseball BioProject)
J. C. Ramírez at Baseball Almanac
J. C. Ramírez at Minor League Baseball (MiLB)

1988 births
Living people
Sportspeople from Managua
Nicaraguan expatriate baseball players in Mexico
Nicaraguan expatriate baseball players in the United States
Major League Baseball players from Nicaragua
Major League Baseball pitchers
Philadelphia Phillies players
Arizona Diamondbacks players
Seattle Mariners players
Cincinnati Reds players
Los Angeles Angels players
Everett AquaSox players
Wisconsin Timber Rattlers players
High Desert Mavericks players
Clearwater Threshers players
Reading Phillies players
Lehigh Valley IronPigs players
Reading Fightin Phils players
Akron RubberDucks players
Columbus Clippers players
Venezuelan Summer League Mariners players
Tiburones de La Guaira players
Reno Aces players
Tacoma Rainiers players
Tomateros de Culiacán players
Louisville Bats players
Inland Empire 66ers of San Bernardino players
Salt Lake Bees players
Diablos Rojos del México players
Nicaraguan expatriate baseball players in Venezuela
Expatriate baseball players in Puerto Rico
Expatriate baseball players in Taiwan
Gigantes de Carolina players
Fubon Guardians players
2023 World Baseball Classic players